The Croatian Basketball All-Star Game is an annual basketball event in Croatia, organised by the Croatian Basketball Federation and it was established in 1993, nearly two years after Croatia gained its independence and organised its first championship. The only All-Star Game experience the Croatian fans had enjoyed prior to the first edition of the 1993–94 season was the 1991 Yugoslav All-Star Game which was the only ever to take place in former Yugoslavia.

List of games
Bold: Team that won the game.

Three-Point Shoot Contest

Slam-Dunk winners

References

Basketball all-star games
Basketball in Croatia